Acridotheres is a genus of starlings, the "typical" mynas, which are tropical members of the family Sturnidae.

Distribution
This genus has representatives in tropical southern Asia from Iran east to southern China and Indonesia. Two species have been introduced widely elsewhere. The common myna has been introduced to South Africa, Israel, Hawaii, North America, Australia and New Zealand, and the crested myna to the Vancouver region of British Columbia.

Morphology
The Acridotheres mynas are generally dark or dull birds with and fluted calls like most starlings; the sexes are similar. They walk and hop, and may share adaptations along with the Sturnus starlings that have modifications to the skull and its muscles for open bill probing or prying. They resemble the hill mynas (Gracula) with which they often co-occur, in having large white or buff wing patches which are obvious in flight and in some also naked areas on the head, but differ in that only the head plumage is glossy, and the underparts tend to be paler. The naked head patches are different in arrangement. Acridotheres mynas are also much more terrestrial than Gracula.

Several species have frontal crests which become covered with pollen when the birds take nectar from flowers, and may play a role in pollination.

Behaviour
They have bowing courtship displays, whereas Gracula has no visual display. They lay unmarked pale blue eggs.

Like most starlings, the Acridotheres mynas are fairly omnivorous, eating fruit, nectar and insects.

Systematics
The genus Acridotheres was introduced by the French ornithologist Louis Jean Pierre Vieillot in 1816. The type species was subsequently designated as the common myna. The name Acridotheres combines the Ancient Greek words akridos "locust" and -thēras "-hunter".

Despite being both called "mynas", the Acridotheres mynas are closer related to a group of mainly terrestrial starlings from Eurasia, such as the common starling, and also African ones like the Lamprotornis glossy-starlings. Among these, they are among the larger and duller species; they seem to be one of the major groups to evolve most recently. Apparently, they all arose from ancestors which arrived from Central Asia and adapted to more humid conditions in the Tropics. They presumably were isolated in about their current range when the evolutionary radiation to which they belonged - including the wattled starling and the Sturnia species - was fragmented by desertification at the start of the Early Pliocene, as Earth turned towards the last ice age 5 million years ago.

Species

The genus contains 11 species:

 Great myna, Acridotheres grandis
 Crested myna, Acridotheres cristatellus
 Javan myna, Acridotheres javanicus
 Pale-bellied myna, Acridotheres cinereus
 Jungle myna, Acridotheres fuscus
 Collared myna, Acridotheres albocinctus
 Bank myna, Acridotheres ginginianus
 Common myna, Acridotheres tristis
 Black-winged myna, Acridotheres melanopterus
 Burmese myna, Acridotheres burmannicus
 Vinous-breasted myna, Acridotheres leucocephalus

Two other species, the red-billed starling (Spodiopsar sericeus) and the white-cheeked starling (Spodiopsar cineraceus), are probably basal in the group and might even be closer to Sturnia. The relationships of the white-faced starling (Sturornis albofrontatus) are more unclear, but it is generally not held to be close to the present genus.

References 

 Feare, Chris & Craig, Adrian (1999): Starlings and Mynas. Princeton University Press. ISBN 0-7136-3961-X
 Grimmett, Richard; Inskipp, Carol, Inskipp, Tim & Byers, Clive (1999): Birds of India, Pakistan, Nepal, Bangladesh, Bhutan, Sri Lanka, and the Maldives. Princeton University Press, Princeton, N.J.. 
 Jønsson, Knud A. & Fjeldså, Jon (2006): A phylogenetic supertree of oscine passerine birds (Aves: Passeri). Zool. Scripta 35(2): 149–186.  (HTML abstract)
 Zuccon, Dario; Cibois, Anne; Pasquet, Eric & Ericson, Per G.P. (2006): Nuclear and mitochondrial sequence data reveal the major lineages of starlings, mynas and related taxa. Molecular Phylogenetics and Evolution 41(2): 333–344.  (HTML abstract)

 
Bird genera
Taxa named by Louis Jean Pierre Vieillot